Jeffrey Scott Cogen (born January 14, 1962) is an American businessman, lawyer, and former politician in the U.S. state of Oregon. From 2016 to 2019, he was Executive Director of Impact NW, a social service and anti-poverty organization headquartered in Portland, Oregon.  He served as chairman of the Multnomah County Board of Commissioners from 2010 to 2013.

Early life 
Jeff Cogen was born on an American military base in Germany and grew up in Miami, Florida, with his parents and brother. In high school, Cogen was a member of the debate team and earned the title of Top Individual Speaker at the Florida State Debate Championship. Cogen attended Brown University, where he received a B.A. degree in Political Science. He then earned a J.D. degree from the University of California, Los Angeles.

Early career 
Cogen practiced law for four years in San Francisco, California, until relocating to Portland, Oregon, with his wife, Lisa in 1992. There, they and some friends started Portland's first certified organic bakery, the Portland Pretzel Company. Cogen was president of the small company, which in early 1996 had eleven other employees.

Political career 
Cogen served as communications director for the Multnomah Commission on Children and Families. He later joined the board for Hands on Greater Portland, a nonprofit that connects volunteers with initiatives in their community, where he was elected board president.

Cogen entered Portland politics by joining former Multnomah County Chair Beverly Stein's staff in 1999. Cogen then went to Portland city hall, and in 2003 was named chief of staff to Portland City Commissioner Dan Saltzman.

In 2006, Cogen was elected to the Multnomah County Board of Commissioners as Commissioner for District 2, representing North and Northeast Portland.

In March 2010, then-Multnomah County Chair Ted Wheeler resigned from his role on the Board of County Commissioners to step into the position of Oregon State Treasurer, to which he was appointed after the death of incumbent Oregon state treasurer Ben Westlund. Soon afterward, the board chose Cogen as Multnomah County Chair, effective April 1, to complete the remainder of Wheeler's term.

In May 2010, Cogen was elected to a four-year term as Multnomah County Chair and sworn in on January 6, 2011.

Projects and initiatives 

During his time on the Multnomah County Board of Commissioners, Cogen has overseen the following efforts:

The opening of the Gateway Center for Domestic Violence Services, a "one-stop center" for domestic violence services in 2010.
The center is run in partnership between Multnomah County and the City of Portland and offers onsite services to domestic violence survivors and their children including:
 Crisis and safety planning
 Restraining order applications
 Access to specially trained police officers
 Prosecution services and support
 Alcohol/drug and mental health assessment services
 Civil legal assistance
 Children and teen support services
Creation of the Multnomah County CROPS Farm: in 2009, Cogen's office launched the Multnomah County CROPS Farm, a piece of county-owned land used to grow fresh produce for the Oregon Food Bank. The surplus Multnomah County property in Troutdale, Oregon, was converted into a two-acre farm and has since grown vegetables for people accessing the Oregon Food Bank.
Sale restriction of reusable beverage containers containing Bisphenol A in Multnomah County: in October 2011, Multnomah County's Board of Health adopted a policy brought forward by Cogen that restricted the sale of all reusable beverage containers that contain Bisphenol A (BPA), a chemical used in certain hard plastic containers like baby bottles, sippy cups and water bottles within Multnomah County.

According to the Multnomah County website, "The Health Department's analysis found that babies and young children are more vulnerable to the effects of Bisphenol A. Disruption of an infant's hormonal system can affect their development, putting them at risk for behavioral problems, breast and prostate cancer and a variety of other issues.

In July 2012, the U.S. Food and Drug Administration (FDA) banned the use of Bisphenol A in sippy cups and baby bottles nationwide.

Change in policy on immigration holds in Multnomah County jails: in April 2013, Multnomah County Sheriff Dan Staton adopted a change in policy developed in partnership between Cogen's office and Multnomah County Sheriff's Office to stop complying with federal immigration holds for low-level offenders in Multnomah County jails.

Prior to this change in policy, people booked in Multnomah County jails and suspected of undocumented immigration by U.S. Immigration Customs and Enforcement (ICE), were held for up to 48 hours at the federal government's request. These 48-hour holds, called I-247 detainers, keep people in jail even after they have been cleared of their booking charges. They can be enforced no matter the allegation.

Under the change in policy, which went into effect April 15, 2013, the Multnomah County Sheriff's Office no longer holds people for U.S. Immigration Customs and Enforcement after their booking charges have cleared if:
 They have been charged with low-level misdemeanors
 An ICE detainer has been issued based solely on immigration charges or convictions
Coal export health impact study: in September 2012, Cogen directed the Multnomah County Health Department to conduct a study on the impact of coal export by rail through Multnomah County on residents' health. The call for the study was brought on by proposals for new coal export terminals in Oregon and Washington.

The report, which was completed by the Health Department in February 2013, looked at populations in Multnomah County that would be most affected by coal transportation by rail, as well as six potential environmental effects of concern, including "emission of particulate matter in the form of coal dust" and "emission of particulate matter in the form of diesel locomotive exhaust." Potential health outcomes associated with coal dust and diesel exhaust identified in the report included "heart and lung problems, cancers, growth and development problems, stress and mental health problems, injury and death."

Creation of a firearms safety ordinance: in April 2013, the Multnomah County Board of Commissioners unanimously approved a firearms safety ordinance co-sponsored by Chair Cogen and District 1 Multnomah County Commissioner, Deborah Kafoury.

According to the Multnomah County website, the ordinance restricts "the possession of a loaded firearm in a public place with certain exceptions, including licensed hunters engaged in lawful hunting, target shooters at an established target shooting area, people licensed to carry a concealed weapon, and law enforcement officers in the performance of their official duty." Additionally, the ordinance restricts "the discharge of a firearm in Multnomah County, requires firearm owners to prevent access to firearms by children, requires reporting the theft of a firearm within 48 hours, and extends curfew hours for minors who have been found by a court to have possessed, bought, used, transferred or transported a firearm and are under supervision.

Opening of the Mental Health Crisis Assessment and Treatment Center (CATC): Cogen coordinated with the City of Portland, the State of Oregon and Central City Concern to open the Mental Health Crisis Assessment and Treatment Center (CATC) in June 2011. The center is located at 55 N.E Grand Ave. in Portland, Oregon.

In 2011, Jaymee Cutti of Oregon Public Broadcasting described the CATC as such: "The 16-bed facility will serve as a safety net for homeless and severely low-income individuals experiencing a mental health crisis, where they can stabilize, and then connect to longer term services for housing, treatment, education or job training."

Sale of the Morrison Bridgehead: in June 2012, the Multnomah County Board of Commissioners unanimously voted in favor of a resolution brought forward by Chair Cogen proposing the $10.4 million sale of the county-owned Morrison Bridgehead site.

The board-approved agreement finalized the sale of the bridgehead to Melvin Mark Development Company for the creation of the James Beard Public Market - a planned year-round indoor and outdoor food market with a high-rise tower and sky-bridge connecting the properties.

The Morrison Bridgehead is a 3.12-acre site on the west side of the Morrison Bridge in downtown Portland, Oregon. It was first acquired by the county in the 1950s as a bridge construction staging area and has most recently been used for surface parking. The site was declared surplus county property in 2004.

Creation of a library district in Multnomah County: the Multnomah County Library is Oregon's largest public library, serving nearly one-fifth of the state's population. It is the second busiest library in the United States.

On August 2, 2012, in a resolution brought forward by Chair Jeff Cogen's office, the Multnomah County Board of Commissioners voted unanimously in favor of referring a measure to the ballot that would allow county residents to vote on the creation of a permanent library district for the Multnomah County Library in the November 2012 election.

Since 1976, the Multnomah County Library system was funded through a combination of the county's general fund and a series of temporary tax levies that had to be renewed by voters every three to five years.

On November 6, 62 percent of county voters voted in favor the ballot measure, approving the creation of a permanent library district for the Multnomah County Library. The library district, effective July 2013, provides funding for the library system solely through a permanent taxing district at a limited rate of up to $1.24 per $1,000 of a property's assessed value in Multnomah County.

Executive rule requiring gender-neutral bathrooms in new and updated Multnomah County buildings: On June 11, 2013, Cogen signed an executive rule requiring that all new and remodeled Multnomah County-owned buildings have gender-neutral bathrooms installed, in addition to traditional gender-specific bathrooms.

According to Dana Tims of The Oregonian, the executive rule "is intended to eliminate stigmas for transgender county employees and visitors using county-owned restrooms."

The rule also calls for the hanging of signage directing people to available gender-neutral restrooms in existing county facilities, as well as an assessment of where there may be a need for gender-neutral restrooms in existing Multnomah County facilities.

According to Sergio Cisneros of Oregon Public Broadcasting, "Multnomah is one of the first counties in the U.S. to implement a gender-neutral bathroom rule. Philadelphia was the first city to have such a rule."

2013 controversy and resignation
In 2013, Cogen admitted to an extramarital affair with a policy advisor in the Multnomah County Health Department following public allegations. The policy advisor resigned under pressure from the county health department for having a conflict of interest. For some weeks, he rejected calls for him to resign, which included a July 24 vote by his four fellow county commissioners. "I deserve a chance for the facts to come out," he told the media. However, on September 6, 2013, he announced his intention to resign, effective ten days later.  His final day in office was September 16. He was succeeded as county chair by his chief of staff, Marissa Madrigal, who was sworn-in on September 17, 2013.

Post-political work
In June 2016, Cogen was named executive director of Impact NW, a social service and anti-poverty organization headquartered in Portland.  He began working in the position on July 1, 2016 and served until April 1, 2019.

In February 2020, Cogen filed his candidacy with the Oregon Secretary of State to run in the 2020 Democratic primary to succeed retiring state Representative Alissa Keny-Guyer in Oregon's 46th House district.

Personal life 
As of 2011, Cogen was living in Northeast Portland with his wife, Lisa and their two children. He enjoys reading science fiction novels and is an avid fan of live music, especially the Grateful Dead.

In July 2017, Cogen suffered a stroke that was described as moderate.

References

Brown University alumni
Multnomah County Commissioners
Living people
Politicians from Miami
Politicians from San Francisco
UCLA School of Law alumni
1962 births
Politicians from Portland, Oregon
Oregon Democrats
21st-century American politicians